Stoneyholme is a district of Burnley, Lancashire, England, situated immediately north of the town centre. It is bounded by the M65 motorway to the west, and by the railway and the Leeds and Liverpool Canal to the east, and consists of predominantly pre-1919 terraced housing.

Stoneyholme developed between 1860 and 1914 to house Burnley's expanding workforce. It had fewer industrial buildings than its near-neighbour Daneshouse, but these included the Ashley Street Dye Works (opened 1909; now converted to workshop units) and several gas holders, two of which survive. In recent years, it has suffered from housing market failure, and is now part of East Lancashire's Elevate scheme to clear, rebuild or remodel sub-standard housing.

It lies in the Daneshouse with Stoneyholme ward, which is 90.85% Asian or Asian British. The index of multiple deprivation places the ward among the 5% most deprived in the United Kingdom. 40.22% of children in the ward are eligible for free school meals. There were 339.8 crimes per 1,000 inhabitants in the year to December 2007 (Lancashire average 89.4), an increase of 3.1% on the previous twelve months.

A £3.6m privately financed project to construct the Burnley Islamic Cultural Centre, together with a new building for the Shah Jalal Mosque and Madrasah, is currently underway in the ward.

References

External links
Stoneyholme Online
Stoneyholme Community Nursery School
Stoneyholme Community Primary School
Sure Start Daneshouse & Stoneyholme

Districts in Burnley